Another Night in London is a live jazz album recorded in 1996 by pianist Gene Harris. It was released in 2010 on the Resonance Records label as a follow up to their best-selling album of 2008 Live in London.

Track listing
"Sweet Georgia Brown"
"Meditation (song)"
"That's All"
"Oh, Lady Be Good"
"This Masquerade"
"Georgia On My Mind"

Personnel

Gene Harris - Piano
Jim Mullen - Guitar
Andrew Cleyndert - Bass
Martin Drew - Drums

References

Gene Harris albums
2010 live albums